Peter John Wyllie (born 8 February 1930, in London, England) is a British petrologist and academic.

He was Professor of Geology at the California Institute of Technology from 1983 until his retirement in 1999. Prior to this, he held positions at the University of St Andrews (1955–56), Pennsylvania State University (1958–59 and 1961–66), the University of Leeds (1959–61), and the University of Chicago (1965–83). He is well known for his many contributions to the understanding of magmatism, particularly through his work on the experimental petrology of magmas and volatiles. In the early 1970s, Wyllie wrote two widely used textbooks; The Dynamic Earth (1971) and The Way the Earth Works (1976) which integrated the new understanding of magmatism and plate tectonics. He is also famous for his contributions to the coverage of earth sciences in the Encyclopædia Britannica, particularly his outline of the field in Part Two of the Propædia. Wyllie was President of the International Union of Geodesy and Geophysics (IUGG) from 1995 to 1999.

Awards and honours
 Polar Medal, 1954
 National Academy of Sciences, USA, 1981
 Wollaston Medal, Geological Society of London, 1982
 Fellow of the Royal Society, London, 1984
 Roebling Medal, Mineralogical Society of America, 2001

References

External links
 

British geologists
Petrologists
1930 births
Scientists from London
Alumni of the University of St Andrews
University of Chicago faculty
University of Pennsylvania faculty
British emigrants to the United States
Wollaston Medal winners
California Institute of Technology faculty
Living people
Fellows of the Royal Society
Foreign associates of the National Academy of Sciences
Foreign Members of the USSR Academy of Sciences
Foreign Members of the Russian Academy of Sciences
Foreign members of the Chinese Academy of Sciences
Foreign Fellows of the Indian National Science Academy
Recipients of the Polar Medal
Presidents of the International Union of Geodesy and Geophysics
Presidents of the International Mineralogical Association